Michèle Minerva (29 January 1959 – 23 August 2021) was a French pétanque player.

Biography
Alongside , Minerva won the 2001  in mixed .

References

1959 births
2021 deaths
French pétanque players